The Sikorsky XBLR-3 was a four-engine bomber designed in 1935-1936 as a competitor to the Boeing XBLR-1 (XB-15) and Douglas XBLR-2 (XB-19). The original XBLR-3 concept was a twin-boom design with both pusher and tractor propellers and multiple gun stations. It later evolved into a more conventional four-engine bomber design. The XBLR-3 was the last land plane designed by Sikorsky before the company converted into producing helicopters in 1938.

References

BLR-3
Cancelled military aircraft projects of the United States
Four-engined tractor aircraft
Low-wing aircraft
Four-engined piston aircraft